The Best Of is a compilation album by former Yugoslav and Serbian hard rock/heavy metal band Osvajači featuring all songs from their first two studio albums Krv i led and Sam.

Track listing 
"Pronađi me" – 4:28
"Nikad više s tobom" – 3:53
"Krv i led" – 4:02
"Sad mi treba" – 3:57
"Bledi ruž" - 3:00
"Gde da pobegnem" – 4:09
"Jako srce udara" – 4:32
"Jedna me devojka neće" – 3:42
"Možda nebo zna" – 5:18
"Duša kad izneveri" – 3:47
"Kad me ostave svi" – 3:41
"Zla noć" – 4:03
"S kim čekaš dan" – 4:18
"Maska" - 4:07
"Tiha predaja" – 3:10
"Vreme za ludake" – 3:20
"Iz sve snage" – 3:24
"Pesma za kraj" – 3:41

Credits
Zvonko Pantović - vocals
Dragan Urošević - guitar
Nebojša Jakovljević - keyboard
Saša Popović - bass guitar
Miša Raca - drums

References
 EX YU ROCK enciklopedija 1960-2006,  Janjatović Petar;  

Osvajači albums
1997 greatest hits albums